Kollbach is a river of Bavaria, Germany. It flows into the Vilskanal, an artificial branch of the Vils, near Roßbach.

See also
List of rivers of Bavaria

References

Rivers of Bavaria
Rivers of Germany